Elephant Walk is a 1954 American drama film produced by Paramount Pictures, directed by William Dieterle, and starring Elizabeth Taylor, Dana Andrews, Peter Finch and Abraham Sofaer.It is based upon the 1948 novel Elephant Walk by "Robert Standish", the pseudonym of the English novelist Digby George Gerahty (1898–1981).

With many sections filmed on location it features several true life insights into the operation of tea plantations and the tea-making process within factories. It also looks at native ceremonies and beliefs. Most of the story centres upon the Elephant Walk Bungalow and the production of Elephant Walk Tea.

Background
It was originally intended to star the husband and wife team of Laurence Olivier and Vivien Leigh (with Olivier in the Finch role). But Olivier was already committed to the project The Beggar's Opera (1953). Leigh was enthusiastic about the role and continued in her husband's absence, but she was forced to withdraw from production shortly after filming began in Colombo, Ceylon, as a result of bipolar disorder. According to Leonard Maltin's annual Movie Guide book, Leigh can be seen in some long shots that were not re-filmed after Elizabeth Taylor replaced her.

Plot
Colonial tea planter John Wiley, visiting England at the end of World War II, weds Ruth and takes her home to Elephant Walk Bungalow, the plantation house built by his father in Ceylon. They are stopped by a bull Indian elephant on their way to the house, which a very angry John frightens away with a few gunshots. Ruth soon discovers John is still dominated by his father, "The Governor", long after the man's death; and that John's mother was never happy at Elephant Walk.  In fact, she left John's father shortly after their marriage but returned when she discovered she was expecting a child; and, eventually, she died.

Ruth has a strained relationship with Apphuamy, the principal servant, whose real master continues to be the late "Governor" – to whose tomb, in the garden, Appuhamy regularly speaks, expressing his dislike of the new mistress.  A very stern, larger than life portrait of "The Governor" is kept in his room, which has not been changed since the old man died – and which is always kept locked. Appuhamy gives a sinister overtone to much of the otherwise genteel story.

Ruth learns from John that Elephant Walk is so named because his father, Tom Wiley, deliberately built it across the path of migration used by a herd of elephants to reach a water source.  The elephants continue to attempt to use their ancient path to get to the water, but are kept out by the walls and the defensive efforts of the servants.  Thus, Ruth's initial delight with the tropical wealth and luxury of her new home is quickly tempered by her isolation as the only European woman in the district; by her husband's occasional imperious arrogance and angry outburst; by Appuhamy's polite but nonetheless insubordinate attitude toward her; by a mutual physical attraction with plantation manager Dick Carver; and by the hovering, ominous menace of the hostile elephants.

The tide of Elephant Walk history turns in Ruth's favour when the district is hit by a cholera epidemic, during which she makes herself indispensable as a relief worker.  Appuhamy confesses to "The Governor" that he was wrong about the new mistress, and he hopes that she will stay.  But Ruth has made John realise that, as long as they stay at Elephant Walk, he will continue to be dominated by his dead father instead of becoming his own man; that they must leave.  In the end, their decision is made for them when the elephants finally manage to break through the wall and stampede onto the grounds, killing Appuhamy in the process.  Elephant Walk Bungalow is smashed and catches fire.  The portrait of the Governor is seen burning, symbolising the end of the old regime.  John and Ruth manage to escape as the house begins to collapse around them.  Dick Carver sees them together in the hills just above the house and realises Ruth will never be his.

As John and Ruth look down upon Elephant Walk burning to the ground, it begins to rain.  "I'm sorry", she says.  "I'm not", he replies.  "Let them have their Elephant Walk.  Ruth, we'll build a new place – a home – somewhere else!"

The bull elephant which appeared on the road (near the beginning of the film) raises his trunk, and gives a mighty trumpet call, as the words appear on the screen, "The End."

Cast

Production
The film was based on a novel published in 1949. Film rights were originally bought by Douglas Fairbanks, Jr. and Alexander MacDonald for their production company, Dougfair. The movie was to be released through United Artists and star Fairbanks and Deborah Kerr. D. M. Marshman Jr. signed to do the script. Filming was postponed due to poor weather in Ceylon.

Fairbanks and MacDonald then decided to transfer the rights over to Paramount, where Irving Asher was given the job of producing. John Lee Mahin was hired to write the script and William Dieterle to direct.

Paramount wanted Laurence Olivier and Vivien Leigh to play the lead roles. Olivier ended up having too many theatre commitments, but Leigh agreed to star; Olivier was replaced by his protege Peter Finch, with Dana Andrews playing the other male lead.

Filming began in Ceylon in February 1953. After four weeks of location work the unit moved to Hollywood for six weeks of studio filming. However, Vivien Leigh missed filming on the second day. She eventually dropped out of the picture altogether, claiming an acute nervous breakdown. Elizabeth Taylor was borrowed from MGM to replace her.

Critical reception
Maltin gave the film 2 stars out of 4, and made one of his pithier critiques: "Pachyderm stampede climax comes none too soon."  A major plot element in the film is that the tea plantation's manor, where the film's action occurs, had been built in the middle of a path that migrating Indian elephants had previously used.

Box Office
According to Kinematograph Weekly the film was a "money maker" at the British box office in 1954.

References

External links 
 
 
 
 

1954 films
Paramount Pictures films
Films based on British novels
American adventure drama films
1950s adventure drama films
Films scored by Franz Waxman
Films directed by William Dieterle
Films shot in Sri Lanka
Films set in Sri Lanka
1954 drama films
1950s English-language films
1950s American films